All That Glitters: Britain's Next Jewellery Star is a BBC reality show that began airing on BBC Two on 13 April 2021. In the show, jewellers compete to be named "Britain's Next Jewellery Star". A spin-off of the format of The Great British Bake Off, the programme is presented by Katherine Ryan, with judges Shaun Leane and Solange Azagury-Partridge (series 1) and Dinny Hall (series 2). The second series began airing on BBC Two in August 2022.

Series format

The show format is similar to The Great British Bake Off in that each episode features challenges which to be completed within a certain time period. The series starts with eight jewellers, with one being eliminated each episode. In the Best Seller challenge, the judges ask the jewellers to create specific jewellery, meeting certain criteria, with a view towards marketability.  In the Bespoke Brief, the jewellers are given a request from a member of the public  to design and create an specific item, with that person then making a selection from the various items made.

Series overview

Series 1 (2021)

The first series of All That Glitters: Britain's Next Jewellery Star started on 13 April 2021 and aired for six episodes, concluding on 18 May. The series was hosted by Katherine Ryan and the judges were Shaun Leane and Solange Azagury-Partridge. The final was won by Hugo Johnson, with Dan Musselwhite and Tamara Gomez as runners up.

Series 2 (2022)

A second series of All That Glitters: Britain's Next Jewellery Star began airing on 25 August 2022 on BBC Two. The second episode was delayed by five days to accommodate coverage of the death of Queen Elizabeth II. The series was again hosted by Katherine Ryan, Shaun Leane returned as judge, alongside new judge Dinny Hall, who replaced Solange Azagury-Partridge. The final was won by Piers Carpenter, with Emma White and Jack Mitchell as runners up.

Transmissions

Series

International versions

Broadcast
 New Zealand - broadcast since 2022 on Eden

See also
The Great British Bake Off
The Great British Sewing Bee
The Great Pottery Throw Down

References

External links
 All That Glitters: Britain's Next Jewellery Star
 
 

All That Glitters: Britain's Next Jewellery Star
2021 British television series debuts
2020s British reality television series
BBC reality television shows
BBC television game shows
British television spin-offs
English-language television shows
Reality television spin-offs
Jewellery
Reality competition television series